The 1960–61 Michigan Wolverines men's basketball team represented the University of Michigan in intercollegiate college basketball during the 1960–61 season.  The team played its home games at Fielding H. Yost Field House (renamed Yost Ice Arena in 1973) on the school's campus in Ann Arbor, Michigan.

Season overview
Under the direction of first-year head coach Dave Strack, the team compiled 6–18 record (2–12 in conference games), finished tenth in the Big Ten Conference and failed to get an invitation to either the 1961 NCAA Men's Division I Basketball Tournament or the 1961 National Invitation Tournament. Over the course of the season, the team lost to both ranked opponents that it faced.  Although it had a 6–6 record at home, it lost all 12 of its road games.

After two road losses to Vanderbilt and Tennessee to open the season, Michigan returned to Yost Field House and won its home opener over Pittsburgh, 86–70, on December 6, 1960.  Team captain and senior, John Tidwell led Michigan's scoring with 38 points.

On February 2, 1961, Michigan tallied its highest point total of the year and easily defeated Western Ontario, 88–58, in a non-conference home game.  All 13 Michigan players saw action against Western Ontario, a team that was "rated as Canada's best."  Tidwell led the team in scoring with 28 points, and Tom Cole led the way on the boards with 13 rebounds.  The team set a Michigan single-game record with 72 rebounds against Western Ontario, but the record would be broken exactly two years later when the current record of 77 was set.

Two days after its victory over the Canadians, Michigan suffered its worst loss of the season, losing at home to an undefeated and No. 1 ranked Ohio State team by a score of 80–58.  The game was played in front of a crowd of 6,000 fans and a regional television audience.  The Associated Press wrote, "The fabulous Buckeys, now 16–0 for the season and 6–0 in the Big Ten, dispatched the conference cellar dwellers with an adding machine offense."

Michigan's second worst loss of the season came on the road against Purdue, 96–79, on February 6, 1961.  Four Michigan players fouled out of the game, as the Wolverines were called for 58 personal fouls.  Purdue converted 40 of 48 free throw attempts.  Michigan's leading scorer, Tidwell, was among the four Wolverines to foul out, and he finished the game with only one point.

On February 13, 1961, Michigan won its first Big Ten Conference game, defeating Michigan State 78–67 in front of a season-high crowd of 6,500 at Yost Field House.  In the battle of in-state rivals, the Wolverines' center, Scott Maentz of East Grand Rapids, was the only Michigan-born player to start for either team.  Michigan's Tom Cole was the high scorer with 29 points.  Maentz, who also played end for the Michigan football team, scored 19 points and pulled in 18 rebounds.

On March 4, 1961, Tidwell established a Big Ten Conference single-game record by making 20 field goals in a 73–70 loss against .  Tidwell also broke his own Michigan single-game scoring record with 43 points in the loss to Minnesota.  Tidwell's Big Ten record of 20 field goals stood until February 16, 1963, when Jimmy Rayl posted 23 for Indiana.

On March 6, 1961, in the final home game of the season, Michigan won only its second conference game, defeating Illinois, 74–66.  Scott Maentz led a second-half rally that put the Wolverines on top.  After a slow start with two points in the first half, Maentz scored 16 points in the second half before fouling out with six minutes left in the game.  Tidwell, playing in his final home game in front of a crowd of 3,000, led Michigan's scorers with 24 points.  Tidwell set nearly every Michigan scoring record, and when he was pulled from the game, he was "given a three-minute, standing ovation for his effort."

On March 11, 1961, Michigan closed its season with an 82–67 loss to Indiana in Bloomington.  The season-ending loss to Indiana is notable in that the two teams set a National Collegiate Athletic Association single-game record that still stands  with 152 total rebounds, 95 by Indiana and 57 for Michigansted 57 rebounds, while Indiana posted 95. Indiana's Walt Bellamy led the effort with 33 rebounds to break his own Indiana record.

At the conclusion of the season, the members of the team chose Tidwell as the team's Most Valuable Player.  Tidwell scored 441 points for a 19.2 point average during his senior year.  Tidwell became the first Wolverine to end his career with a 20-point per game scoring average, and his career point total (1,386) eclipsed the school scoring record set by Ron Kramer in 1957 (1,119).  Bill Buntin broke Tidwell's scoring record in 1965 with 1,725 points and a 21.8 point per game average.

Schedule

Player statistics
The following player statistics are taken from the University of Michigan's Men's Basketball Statistic Archive Query Page.

Team players drafted into the NBA
One player from this team were selected in the NBA Draft.

References

Michigan
Michigan Wolverines men's basketball seasons
Michigan Wolverines basketball
Michigan Wolverines basketball